The 2016 Sioux City Bandits season was the team's sixteenth as the Sioux City Bandits, seventeenth overall and second as a member of Champions Indoor Football (CIF). One of 12 teams in the CIF for the 2016 season, they played in the 6-team Northern Division.

The Bandits play their home games at the Tyson Events Center in Sioux City, Iowa, under the direction of head coach Erv Strohbeen. The team's offensive coordinator is Jarrod DeGeorgia, the defensive coordinator is John Zevenbergen, and the assistant coaches include Greg Stallman and Justin Hayes.

Awards and honors
Each week of the regular season, the CIF names league-wide Players of the Week in offensive, defensive, and special teams categories. For Week 1, the CIF named cornerback Rahn Franklin as the Defensive Player of the Week. For Week 2, the CIF named cornerback Jon Smith as the Defensive Player of the Week. For Week 5, the CIF named defensive lineman Ben Pister as the Defensive Player of the Week. For Week 11, the CIF named wide receiver Frederick Bruno as the Special Teams Player of the Week. In Round 1 of the playoffs, running back Drew Prohaska was named the offensive player of the week when he broke Fred Jackson's single game rush yard record.

Schedule
Key:

Regular season

Post-season

Roster

Standings

Playoffs

References

Sports in Sioux City, Iowa
Sioux City Bandits
Sioux City Bandits
2016 in sports in Iowa